Tamara Macarena Valcárcel Serrano (born 27 June 1984) is a singer from Seville, Spain. She is the granddaughter of singer Rafael Farina.

Discography
 1999 – "Gracias"
 2001 – "Siempre"
 2003 – "Abrázame"
 2004 – "Canta Roberto Carlos"
 2005 – "Lo Mejor de Tu Vida"
 2006 – "Emociónes en Directo"
 2007 – "Perfecto"
 2009 – "Amores"
 2011 – "Más"
 2012 – "Encandenados"
 2013 – "Incondicional"
 2015 – "Lo Que Calla El Alma"

References

1984 births
People from Seville
Living people
21st-century Spanish singers